The Placynthiaceae are a lichenized family of fungi in the order Peltigerales. Species of this family are found largely in northern temperate regions.

Genera
Numbers of species accepted by Species Fungorum;
Hertella - 3 spp.

Placynthiopsis - 1 sp. (Placynthiopsis africana )
Placynthium - 20 spp.

References

Peltigerales
Lichen families
Lecanoromycetes families
Taxa described in 1950